The Record Society of Lancashire and Cheshire is a text publication society that publishes historical documents relating to the traditional counties of Lancashire and Cheshire.  It became a registered charity (No. 500434) for public education in the history of the two counties in 1970.

History 
The society was founded in 1878, when one of the region's foremost historians, John Parsons Earwaker, suggested to his colleagues in the Chetham Society that they should form another organisation to foster their common interest in local history. Earwaker served as the society's founding Secretary (until his death in 1895) although, towards the end of his life, his other commitments led to delays in the society's planned publications.

The bibliophile James Crossley, President of the Chetham Society, was the founding President, and another prominent early member (and later vice-president) was William Ecroyd Farrer.

Publications 
Publication started with Lancashire and Cheshire Church Surveys 1649–1655, edited by Henry Fishwick (1879). Earwaker soon gained permission to publish lists of wills that had been proved in Chester, which was "hailed as a coup"; G. E. Cokayne, Lancaster Herald, wrote to congratulate Earwaker, stating that "I do not think there is any work that has been at any time, or that could be now, more useful." The index ran to seven volumes (covering 1545–1760); according to Earwaker's obituary, "their value to students of local history is incalculable".

Other important documents that have been published by the society include part of De laude Cestrie, edited by Margerie Venables Taylor, one of the earliest examples of prose writing concerning an English urban centre. Many of the early volumes have been digitised by the Internet Archive. The society has published more than 150 volumes (2019), an up-to-date list of which is maintained by the Royal Historical Society. The most recent volumes are The Diaries of William Lloyd Holden, 1829 and 1830, edited by Jonathan Pepler (2019), The Cheshire Motor Vehicle Registrations, edited by Craig Horner (2019) and The First Minute Book of the Liverpool Athenaeum, 1797-1809, edited by David Brazendale and Mark Towsey (2020).

When the society published a volume of early Cheshire charters (1958) in honour of its long-serving President, William Fergusson Irvine, a local newspaper described the book as "beautifully printed and illustrated...well worthy of the distinguished scholar in whose honour it had been produced".

Recent reviews of the society's volumes have described them as "invaluable for anyone interested in the history of this area", and pointed out that they are "well edited" and the documents "thoroughly explained". One review (2013) observed that by bringing to public attention documents that are an "under used resource", the society's publications could allow "insights into parish and community life rarely available in other sources".

Membership
Membership is open to all individuals and societies who are interested in the various historical aspects of the two counties Palatine.

Officers

Presidents

Vice-Presidents

Secretaries

Treasurers

Editors

See also

Chetham Society
Historic Society of Lancashire and Cheshire
Lancashire and Cheshire Antiquarian Society
Lancashire Parish Register Society

External links 
Official website

References 

1878 establishments in England
Regional and local learned societies of the United Kingdom
History organisations based in the United Kingdom
Historical societies of the United Kingdom
Organizations established in 1878